

148001–148100 

|-id=081
| 148081 Sunjiadong ||  || Sun Jiadong (born 1929), aerospace-technologist-academician of the Chinese Academy of Sciences || 
|}

148101–148200 

|-bgcolor=#f2f2f2
| colspan=4 align=center | 
|}

148201–148300 

|-bgcolor=#f2f2f2
| colspan=4 align=center | 
|}

148301–148400 

|-id=384
| 148384 Dalcanton ||  || Julianne Dalcanton (born 1968), American astronomer with the Sloan Digital Sky Survey and discoverer of comet  || 
|}

148401–148500 

|-bgcolor=#f2f2f2
| colspan=4 align=center | 
|}

148501–148600 

|-bgcolor=#f2f2f2
| colspan=4 align=center | 
|}

148601–148700 

|-id=604
| 148604 Shobbrook ||  || John Shobbrook (born 1948), American supporter of the Rose-Hulman Oakley Observatory in Indiana, where this minor planet was discovered || 
|}

148701–148800 

|-id=707
| 148707 Dodelson ||  || Scott Dodelson (born 1959), American physicist with the Sloan Digital Sky Survey || 
|-id=780
| 148780 Altjira ||  || Altjira, from Australian Aboriginal mythology. He is the central god of the Dreamtime who created the Earth and then retired to the sky. || 
|}

148801–148900 

|-bgcolor=#f2f2f2
| colspan=4 align=center | 
|}

148901–149000 

|-bgcolor=#f2f2f2
| colspan=4 align=center | 
|}

References 

148001-149000